The men's 200 metres competition of the athletics event at the 2015 Southeast Asian Games was held on 10 June at the National Stadium in Singapore.

Records
Prior to this competition, the existing Asian and Games records were as follows:

Schedule

Results

Round 1

 Qualification: First 3 in each heat (Q) and the next 2 fastest (q) advance to the final.

Heat 1 

 Wind: +0.2 m/s

Heat 2 

 Wind: -0.1 m/s

Final 

 Wind: -0.1 m/s

References

See also

Men's 100 metres